The Kakshaal Too (Qaqşaal Too, قاقشاال توو) is a large mountain range in the Central Tien-Shan. It stretches for a length of 582 km (in Kyrgyzstan) between Kyrgyzstan and China. The highest point in the range is Jengish Chokusu. The range is mainly composed of limestones, siltstones, sandstones, conglomerates, and argillites of Paleozoic intruded by granites, granosyenite, and syenite.

References

Mountain ranges of Kyrgyzstan
Mountain ranges of Xinjiang
Mountain ranges of the Tian Shan